Rod McDonald may refer to:

 Rod McDonald (footballer, born 1967), English footballer
 Rod McDonald (footballer, born 1992), English footballer for Carlisle United F.C.
 Rod McDonald (typographer)

See also
 Rod MacDonald (born 1948), American singer-songwriter, novelist, and educator